Home Cookin may refer to:
Home Cookin' (band), a horn-based soul band that played in the Las Vegas local scene from 1989 to 2000
 Home Cookin' (album), an album by American jazz organist Jimmy Smith
 Home Cookin' (Junior Walker album), 1969 album by Junior Walker